Rákóczi may refer to:
 Rákóczi, a Hungarian noble family in the Kingdom of Hungary
 Rákóczi Association, a Budapest-based non-governmental organization
 Rákóczi Avenue, one of the arterial roads in Budapest, Hungary
 Rákóczi Bridge, a bridge in Budapest, Hungary
 Rákóczi Festival, the largest city festival in the German spa town of Bad Kissingen 
 Rákóczi March, one of the unofficial state anthems of Hungary
 Rákóczi Museum, a historic house museum in Tekirdağ, northwestern Turkey
 Rákóczi Stadion, a multi-use stadium in Kaposvár, Hungary
 Rákóczi's War of Independence, the first significant attempt to topple the rule of the Habsburgs over Hungary